The 2004 GMAC Bowl was an American college football bowl game. It was part of the 2004 NCAA Division I-A football season, and was the 7th edition. It was played in December 2004, and featured the Memphis Tigers, and the Bowling Green Falcons.

Game recap
Before the game, heavy rains soaked the field and continued through almost the whole game.  Running back PJ Pope scored on a 1-yard touchdown run, to give Bowling Green an early 7–0 lead. Quarterback Omar Jacobs threw an 18-yard touchdown pass to wide receiver Charles Sharon, stretching the lead out to 14–0. Memphis's quarterback Danny Wimprine threw a 42-yard touchdown pass to John Doucette to cut the lead to 14–7. Omar Jacobs again hooked up with Charlie Sharon, this time on a 36-yard touchdown pass to gain a 21–7 lead after the 1st quarter.

In the second quarter, Danny Wimprine found wide receiver Chris Kelly for a 61-yard touchdown pass, to get within 21–14. Omar Jacobs found Steve Sanders for a 31-yard touchdown pass to extend the lead to 28–14. Danny Wimprine found Maurice Avery for a 38-yard touchdown pass, and the lead was 28–21. DeAngelo Williams later scored on a 31-yard touchdown run to tie the game at 28.

Before halftime, Omar Jacobs found Steve Sanders again, this time for a 17-yard touchdown pass to regain the lead at 35–28. In the third quarter, he threw a 13-yard touchdown pass to PJ Pope, to extend the lead to 42–28. A Shaun Suisham field goal increased the lead to 45–28. A PJ Pope touchdown run in the fourth quarter increased the lead to 52–28. John Doucette scored on a 14-yard touchdown pass from Danny Wimprine, to make the final score 52–35.

References

External links
 USA Today summary
 ESPN summary

Gmac Bowl
LendingTree Bowl
Bowling Green Falcons football bowl games
Memphis Tigers football bowl games
December 2004 sports events in the United States
2004 in sports in Alabama